is a Japanese astronomer. He is a prolific co-discoverer of minor planets. One of his co-discoveries is the dark, inner main-belt asteroid 3915 Fukushima. He retired from docent for astronomy at Sapporo Science Center.

The asteroid 4260 Yanai, discovered by Japanese astronomers Seiji Ueda and Hiroshi Kaneda at Kushiro Observatory in 1989, was named in his honor on 8 July 1990.

List of discovered minor planets

See also
List of minor planets: 17001–18000
National Astronomical Observatory of Japan

References

External links

1959 births
21st-century Japanese astronomers
Discoverers of asteroids

20th-century Japanese astronomers
Living people